Delhi–Jaipur Highway or NH48 is a , eight-lane, Highway, connecting Delhi with Jaipur in India. It starts from Kherki Toll Plaza in Gurugram and terminate near Daulatpura Toll Plaza at Jaipur.

Several  Industrial Model Township(IMT) were developed along the highway in 1990's, four in Haryana at Manesar, Pataudi, Bawal and Dharuhera Industrial estate, and five in Rajasthan at Bhiwadi, Behror, Kotputli, Shahapura and Chomu.

History 
It was widened in 2007 as a National Highway passing through 423 villages of 11 tehsils in 7 districts of Haryana and Rajasthan. The cost includes ₹6,350 crores for civil works, ₹5,000 crores for resettlement and rehabilitation of affected individuals, and ₹50.60 crores for environment budget.

In 2006–07, the Ministry of Road Transport and Highways of the UPA government planned to construct a new greenfield expressway of 195kms. In 2011, detailed project planning commenced. In 2012, Haryana and Rajasthan Governments approved the proposed alignment.

In 2015, the new Highway Minister Nitin Gadkari expedited ₹32,800 crores stalled project, by revising the alignment so that the expressway starts from Kherki Dhaula Toll Plaza instead of originally planned point of origin at Indira Gandhi International Airport.

In 2023, The National Highways Authority of India (NHAI) has started work on a new greenfield "super expressway" between Delhi and Jaipur also known as Delhi-Jaipur Super Expressway that will reduce the distance between the two cities by around 40 km. The 8 lane on each carriageway (expandable to 16 lanes) Delhi-Jaipur super expressway has been numbered as NH 352B. The entire greenfield section of 195kms will start from Dwarka Expressway in New Gurgaon, go via IMT Bawal and end in Chandwaji, Rajasthan.

Alignment 
 In Haryana 
 Kherki Toll Plaza in Gurugram, serves IMT Manesar
 Western Peripheral Expressway cloverleaf interchange at Pachgaon, serves Industrial Township at Pataudi
 Dharuhera intersection with NH919 Rewari-Sohna, serves Dharuhera Industrial Township and Bhiwadi Industrial complex
 Bawal, serves IMT Bawal
 In Rajasthan 
 NH15 T-intersection at Bawad
 Behror interchange with RJ SH 14 Narnaul-Alwar, serves Nangal Choudhary Integrated Multimodel Logistics Hub
 Kotputli interchange at NH37B to Neem-Ka-Thana
 Shahpura industrial township
 Chomu industrial township
 Jaipur interchanges at NH52, NH2C and NH48

See also 
 National highways of India
 Expressways in India
 Expressways & highways in Haryana

References 

Transport in Jaipur
Transport in Delhi
Expressways in Delhi
Transport in Rajasthan
Expressways in Haryana